This is a list of the main career statistics of professional tennis player Kristina Mladenovic.

Performance timelines

Only main-draw results in WTA Tour, Grand Slam tournaments, Fed Cup/Billie Jean King Cup and Olympic Games are included in win–loss records.

Singles
Current after the 2023 WTA Lyon Open.

Doubles
Current after the 2023 Australian Open.

Mixed doubles

Grand Slam tournament finals

Doubles: 10 (6 titles, 4 runner-ups)

Mixed doubles: 5 (3 titles, 2 runner-ups)

Other significant finals

Year-end championships

Doubles: 2 (2 titles)

WTA 1000 finals

Singles: 1 (1 runner-up)

Doubles: 8 (4 titles, 4 runner-ups)

WTA career finals

Singles: 8 (1 title, 7 runner-ups)

Doubles: 43 (28 titles, 15 runner-ups)

WTA Challenger finals

Singles: 3 (1 title, 2 runner-ups)

Doubles: 3 (2 titles, 1 runner-up)

ITF Circuit finals

Singles: 8 (6 titles, 2 runner–ups)

Doubles: 10 (8 titles, 2 runner–ups)

Team competition

Junior Grand Slam finals

Singles: 2 (1 title, 1 runner–up)

WTA Tour career earnings
Current as of 23 May 2022

Career Grand Slam statistics

Grand Slam seedings
The tournaments won by Mladenovic are in boldface, and advanced into finals by Mladenovic are in italics.

Singles

Doubles

Head-to-head record

Record against top 10 players
Active players are in boldface.

No. 1 wins

Top 10 wins

Longest losing streaks

15-match losing streak (2017-18)

Notes

References

Mladenovic, Kristina